Chlorous acid is an inorganic compound with the formula HClO2. It is a weak acid. Chlorine has oxidation state +3 in this acid.  The pure substance is unstable, disproportionating to hypochlorous acid (Cl oxidation state +1) and chloric acid (Cl oxidation state +5):
 2 HClO2   →   HClO  + HClO3

Although the acid is difficult to obtain in pure substance, the conjugate base, chlorite, derived from this acid is stable. One example of a salt of this anion is the well-known sodium chlorite.  This and related salts are sometimes used in the production of chlorine dioxide.

Preparation
HClO2 can be prepared through reaction of barium or lead chlorite and dilute sulfuric acid:
Ba(ClO2)2 + H2SO4 → BaSO4 + 2 HClO2
Pb(ClO2)2 + H2SO4 → PbSO4 + 2 HClO2

Stability
Chlorous acid is a powerful oxidizing agent, although its tendency to disproportionation counteracts its oxidizing potential.

Chlorine is the only halogen to form an isolable acid of formula HXO2. Neither bromous acid nor iodous acid has ever been isolated.  A few salts of bromous acid, bromites, are known, but no iodites.

References

Chlorites
Halogen oxoacids
Hydrogen compounds
Oxidizing acids
Oxidizing agents